Awards and decorations may refer to:
 Award, something given to a recipient in recognition of excellence in a certain field
 Civil awards and decorations, awarded to civilians for distinguished service or for eminence in a field of endeavour
 Military awards and decorations, distinctions given as a mark of honor for military heroism, meritorious or outstanding service or achievement

See also
Decoration (disambiguation)